Circle (also called Circle City;) is a census-designated place (CDP) in Yukon-Koyukuk Census Area, Alaska, United States. At the 2010 census the population was 104, up from 100 in 2000.

Every February, Circle City hosts a checkpoint for the long-distance Yukon Quest sled dog race.

There is only one general store which also houses the only fuel pump in town. The price of fuel is generally close to double that of Fairbanks.

Many of the events in John McPhee's 1976 non-fiction book Coming into the Country occur in Circle.

In Truman Capote's non-fiction book In Cold Blood, Perry Edward Smith mentions spending time with his father in Circle City.

Geography
Circle is located at  (65.834464, -144.076392).

Climate

According to the Köppen Climate Classification system, Circle has a subarctic climate, abbreviated "Dfc" on climate maps.

Demographics

Circle first appeared on the 1900 U.S. Census as "Circle City," although it was an unincorporated village. Its name was shortened to Circle for the 1910 census. It was made a census-designated place in 1980.

At the 2000 census, there were 100 people, 34 households and 22 families residing in the CDP. The population density was 0.9 per square mile (0.4/km2). There were 42 housing units at an average density of 0.4 per square mile (0.2/km2). The racial makeup of the CDP was 14.00% White, 76.00% Native American, 1.00% from other races, and 9.00% from two or more races. 4.00% of the population were Hispanic or Latino of any race.

There were 34 households, of which 29.4% had children under the age of 18 living with them, 11.8% were married couples living together, 32.4% had a female householder with no husband present, and 32.4% were non-families. 23.5% of all households were made up of individuals, and 5.9% had someone living alone who was 65 years of age or older. The average household size was 2.94 and the average family size was 3.48.

29.0% of the population was under the age of 18, 10.0% from 18 to 24, 27.0% from 25 to 44, 30.0% from 45 to 64, and 4.0% who were 65 years of age or older. The median age was 34 years. For every 100 females, there were 100.0 males. For every 100 females age 18 and over, there were 115.2 males.

The median household income was $11,667, and the median family income was $11,250. Males had a median income of $0 versus $23,750 for females. The per capita income for the CDP was $6,426. There were 50.0% of families and 42.0% of the population living below the poverty line, including 57.9% of under eighteens and none of those over 64.

History
Circle was established in 1893 when gold was discovered in Birch Creek; it served as an unloading point for supplies shipped up the Yukon River from the Bering Sea. The goods were sent overland to gold mining camps. In 1896, before the Klondike Gold Rush, Circle was the largest mining town on the Yukon River and had a population of 700. It had a store, a few dance halls, an opera house, a library, a school, a hospital, an American Episcopal church, a newspaper, a mill, and several federal officials: United States commissioner, marshal, customs inspector, tax collector and a postmaster.

Circle lost much of its population after gold discoveries in the Klondike in 1897, and Nome in 1899. A few miners stayed near Circle. Mining in the area has continued into the 21st century. Most of the residents of Circle today are Athabascan.

Education
Yukon Flats School District operates the Circle School.

References

Census-designated places in Alaska
Census-designated places in Unorganized Borough, Alaska
Census-designated places in Yukon–Koyukuk Census Area, Alaska
Yukon Quest
Yukon River